Hoceinia is a town in northern Algeria. It is situated near the National Road N 14. Also, it is bordered by the municipality of Boumedfaa, Djendel, Ain-Torki, and Ain Al-Banyan.

Communes of Aïn Defla Province